Matt(hew) Henry may refer to:

Matthew Henry (1662–1714), English commentator on the Bible and Presbyterian minister
Matt Henry (cricketer) (born 1991), New Zealand international cricketer
Matt Henry (singer), British singer and actor

See also